The Hobie Wave is an American catamaran that was designed by Morrelli & Melvin and first built in 1994.

Production
The design has been built by Hobie Cat in the United States since 1994 and remained in production in 2019.

Design
The Hobie Wave is a recreational sailboat, with its hulls made from rotomolded polyethylene and an aluminum mast. It has a catboat single sail rig, or, optionally a fractional sloop rig. The mainsail is fully battened and does not employ a boom. It has plumb stems, reverse transoms, transom-hung rudders controlled by a tiller and no keel.

The boat has a capacity of four people.

A mast-top float to prevent the boat turning turtle is included as optional equipment.

The Wave has a D-PN of 92.1.

Operational history
The design has proven popular at resorts, due to its rugged construction.

Variants
Wave
Base catboat-rigged model designed for recreational use. Jib and spinnaker are factory options.
Wave Turbo
Model with jib kit.
Wave Club
Model designed for "schools, organizations or resorts".

See also
List of sailing boat types

References

External links

Catamarans
Dinghies
1990s sailboat type designs
Sailing yachts
Sailboat type designs by Gino Morrelli
Sailboat type designs by Pete Melvin
Sailboat types built by Hobie Cat